The Valea Mare is a left tributary of the river Crișul Negru in Romania. It flows into the Crișul Negru near Cusuiuș.

References

Rivers of Romania
Rivers of Bihor County